Frank Christopher Garcia (born January 28, 1972, Phoenix, Arizona) is a former American football player in the National Football League. He was drafted by the Carolina Panthers in the 1995 NFL Draft. He also played for the St. Louis Rams and the Arizona Cardinals.

Garcia was suspended from the NFL for the first 4 games of the 2003 season after testing positive for the banned substance ephedra, and has not played since that season. He played college football at the University of Washington, including the Huskies 1994 upset of the University of Miami.

Garcia had his own radio show in Charlotte, North Carolina and coaches football at Charlotte Catholic High School.

References

1972 births
Living people
American football centers
American football offensive guards
Carolina Panthers players
St. Louis Rams players
Arizona Cardinals players
Washington Huskies football players